The 2014 Bonnaroo Music Festival was held June 12–15, 2014 in Manchester, Tennessee, United States, and marked the 13th time the festival has been held since its inception in 2002.

Line-up

Thursday, June 12

(artists listed from earliest to latest set times)

This Tent:
Jonathan Wilson
Cass McCombs
Thao & The Get Down Stay Down
Cloud Nothings
BANKS
J Roddy Walston and the Business
Ty Segall
That Tent:
The Preatures
Allah-Las 
ZZ Ward
Real Estate
Cherub
Omar Souleyman
White Denim
The Other Tent:
The Wild Feathers
Robert Delong
Caveman
MS MR
Break Science
Poliça
Pusha T
Comedy Theatre:
Taran Killam and his Friends with Good Neighbor, Ryan Belleville and Tim Robinson
Hannibal Buress with Sasheer Zamata and Emily Heller
Bonnaroo Nights with Brooks Wheelan, Emily Heller, Sasheer Zamata, Brad Williams and Seth Herzog
Bonnaroo Nights with Brooks Wheelan, Emily Heller, Sasheer Zamata and Seth Herzog
New Music On Tap Lounge brewed by Miller Lite:
Bully
The Unlikely Candidates
AM & Shawn Lee (canceled)
The Saint Johns
Monster Truck
Parade of Lights
Hunter Hunted
Kins
Silent Disco:
Quickie Mart
DJ Logic
AM & Shawn Lee (DJ Set; canceled)
Robert DeLong (DJ Set)
Cinema Tent:
Green Screens Presented by Rock The Earth: The Human Experiment - Q&A with Scott Banbury of the Sierra Club
The First and Probably Last Annual Bonnaroo Intergalactic Feline Film & Video Festival For Humans - Hosted by Mike Keegan and Jay Wertzler
Take Me to the River - Screening and Q&A with director Martin Shore plus Live Performance with William Bell, Bobby Rush, Frayser Boy, Al Kapone, Jerry Harrison, the Norman Sisters, Ify, Stax Music Academy Students, the Hi Rhythm Section, Ben Cauley and the Royal Memphis Horns, and Boo Mitchell
NBA Finals Game 4
Live interactive performance: Point Break Live! – You Can BE Keanu!
[IFC] and The Action Pack Present: R. Kelly’s Trapped in the Closet Sing-Along – Hosted by Henri Mazza
Solar Stage:
Ogya (Afrobeat)
Raising Caine
Bonnaroots Dinner
Snake & Jake's Christmas Club Barn
Tiki Disco
High & Mighty Brass Band
Full Service Party
Gypsyphonic Disco
Tiki Disco

Friday, June 13
(artists listed from earliest to latest set times)

What Stage:
Greensky Bluegrass
Big Sam's Funky Nation
Umphrey's McGee
Janelle Monáe
Vampire Weekend
Kanye West
Which Stage:
Vintage Trouble
Dr. Dog
Ben Howard
The Head and the Heart
Phoenix
Ice Cube
Skrillex
This Tent:
Jon Batiste and Stay Human
The Wood Brothers
Jake Bugg
Andrew Bird & the Hands of Glory
Neutral Milk Hotel
Mastodon
Deafheaven
Meshuggah
That Tent:
La Santa Cecilia
Seun Kuti & Egypt 80
DakhaBrakha
The Master Musicians of Jajouka led by Bachir Attar, with special guests Billy Martin, Marc Ribot, DJ Logic and Shahzad Ismaily
A Tribe Called Red
SuperJam: Derek Trucks featuring Chaka Khan, Taj Mahal, Eric Krasno, Willie Weeks, Nigel Hall, Eric Bloom, Ryan Zoidis, James Gadson, David Hidalgo, and Adam Deitch with special guests Andrew Bird, Susan Tedeschi, Karl Denson, and Ben Folds
Chance The Rapper
The Other Tent:
St. Paul & The Broken Bones
Sam Smith
Danny Brown
The Naked and Famous
CHVRCHES
Disclosure
Die Antwoord
Comedy Theatre:
Craig Robinson & the Nasty Delicious with Seth Herzog and Brooks Wheelan
Hannibal Buress with Sasheer Zamata and Emily Heller
T.J. Miller and Neal Brennan with Rory Scovel
Taran Killam and his Friends with Good Neighbor, Ryan Belleville and Tim Robinson
Cafe Where?:
Donald Cumming
Lily & the Parlour Tricks
Skinny Lister
Empires
New Music On Tap Lounge brewed by Miller Lite:
Royal Teeth
Arc Iris
Roadkill Ghost Choir
John & Jacob
The Orwells
Fly Golden Eagle
Animals As Leaders
Blank Range
Speedy Ortiz
Diarrhea Planet
Silent Disco:
Le Chev
Classixx (DJ Set)
Tiki Disco
DJ Logic
Jared Dietch
Cinema Tent:
LIVE PERFORMANCE: Marc Ribot and Charlie Chaplin's The Kid
Green Screens Presented by Rock The Earth: DamNation - Introduction by Andrew Bird / Q&A with Morgan Beard of Sub-Genre [sic] Films
Finding Fela - Q&A with Seun Kuti
This Is The End - Introduction by Craig Robinson
The Action Pack Presents: Big Screen Yacht Rock Smooth Jamz Karaoke Party - Hosted by Henri Mazza
LIVE INTERACTIVE PERFORMANCE: Terminator Too: Judgment Play Live! - You Can BE Arnold!
Friday the 13th - The Original 1980 Version
Solar Stage:
Breathing with The Art of Living
Skinny Lister (Performance & Interview)
Bronze Radio Return (Performance & Interview)
Meet the Bonnaroo Works Fund
Lily & the Parlour Tricks (Performance & Interview)
Arc Iris (Performance & Interview)
DJ Alpha Trion & the Bonnaroo B-Boys
Ogya (Afrobeat)
Sonic Stage:
Hunter Hunted
Jonathan Wilson
ZZ Ward (acoustic)
Greensky Bluegrass
Jon Batiste and Stay Human
The Wood Brothers
J Roddy Walston and the Business
AM & Shawn Lee
Snake & Jake's Christmas Club Barn:
High and Mighty Brass Band
Full Service Party
Friday the 13th Party (Full Service Party)
Tiki Disco

Saturday, June 14
(artists listed from earliest to latest set times)

What Stage:
Seasick Steve
Tedeschi Trucks Band
Damon Albarn
Lionel Richie
Jack White
Which Stage:
High and Mighty Brass Band
Blackberry Smoke
Cake
Cage the Elephant
Chromeo
Zedd
The Flaming Lips
Kaskade
This Tent:
Valerie June
First Aid Kit
Drive-By Truckers
Phosphorescent
Cut Copy
SuperJam with Skrillex and friends featuring Big Gigantic with special guests Damian "Jr. Gong" Marley, Joel Cummins of Umphrey's McGee, Robby Krieger (of The Doors), Zedd, Mickey Hart, Janelle Monáe, Warpaint, Mike Einziger, A$AP Ferg, Thundercat, and more
That Tent:
King Khan and the Shrines
The Bouncing Souls
Grouplove
Slightly Stoopid
James Blake
Nick Cave & The Bad Seeds
Darkside
The Other Tent:
Classixx
Haerts
Bobby Womack
John Butler Trio
Ms. Lauryn Hill
Frank Ocean
The Glitch Mob
Comedy Theatre:
Craig Robinson & the Nasty Delicious with Seth Herzog
Down N' Dirty with Broad City Live, Bridget Everett & the Tender Moments and Brad Williams (2 sets)
Neal Brennan and T.J. Miller with Rory Scovel
Cafe Where?:
Royal Canoe
Sam Hunt
Jamestown Revival
The Black Cadillacs
New Music On Tap Lounge brewed by Miller Lite:
ELEL
The Lonely Biscuits 
Kevin Devine 
Wild Child 
The Bots
The Dunwells 
Streets of Laredo
Syd Arthur
Ásgeir
Silent Disco:
Holden
Solu Music 
Le Chev 
Jared Dietch 
Classixx (DJ Set)
Jonathan Toubin
Cinema Tent:
Spotlight on the Farrelly Brothers: Kingpin - Q&A with Peter & Bobby Farrelly
Spotlight on the Farrelly Brothers: Dumb and Dumber - 20th Anniversary - Introduction by Peter & Bobby Farrelly
Comedy Central's "Drunk History" Live - with Derek Waters & Friends
Comedy Central's "Brickleberry" Live - with co-creators and voice actors Roger Black and Waco O'Guin
Green Screens Presented by Rock The Earth: Above All Else - Q&A with executive producer Paul Bassis
Ping Pong Summer
Dear White People
The Action Pack Presents: Michael Jackson Sing-Along - Hosted by Henri Mazza
Remembering Harold Ramis: Groundhog Day
Solar Stage:
Breathing with The Art of Living
Red Bull Music Academy Panel
Represent US: Taking Back Our Government Discussion
John Butler
B'rooers University Highlights and Sustainability
Jamestown Revival
Wayne Coyne
BonnaROOTS Dinner
DJ Alpha Trion & The Bonnaroo B-Boys
Sonic Stage:
The Saint Johns
Wild Child
Jeremy Messersmith
Cherub
The Dunwells
Caveman
Desert Noises
Cayucas
Snake & Jake's Christmas Club Barn:
NOLA Bounce Party (Full Service Party)
Full Service Party
Rob Rage
90's Rave Party (Full Service Party)

Sunday, June 15

(artists listed from earliest to latest set times)

What Stage:
Carolina Chocolate Drops
Yonder Mountain String Band
Arctic Monkeys
The Avett Brothers
Elton John
Which Stage:
Lucero
Capital Cities
Fitz and the Tantrums
Broken Bells
Wiz Khalifa
This Tent:
Vance Joy
Okkervil River
Warpaint
City and Colour
Amos Lee
That Tent:
Lake Street Dive
Sarah Jarosz
The Lone Bellow
Shovels & Rope
The Black Lillies
The Bluegrass Situation SuperJam hosted by Ed Helms
The Other Tent:
Those Darlins
Goat
A$AP Ferg
Washed Out
Little Dragon
Comedy Theatre:
Down N' Dirty with Broad City Live, Bridget Everett & the Tender Moments and Brad Williams
Neal Brennan and T.J. Miller with Rory Scovel (2 sets)
Cafe Where?:
Black Pistol Fire
Jennifer Sullivan
The Griswolds
Wild Child
New Music On Tap Lounge brewed by Miller Lite:
Kansas Bible Company
TBA
The Futures League
Jeremy Messersmith
Willy Mason
Cayucas
Bronze Radio Return
Silent Disco:
Jonathan Toubin
Cinema Tent:
They Came Together - Q&A with director/co-writer David Wain
Spotlight on Harry Shearer: This Is Spinal Tap 30th Anniversary - Q&A with Harry Shearer
Spotlight on Harry Shearer: A Mighty Wind - Introduction by Harry Shearer
NBA Finals Game 5 (if necessary)
Solar Stage:
Breathing with The Art of Living
The Lone Bellow (Performance & Interview)
Roadkill Ghost Choir (Performance & Interview)
Music For Social Change (The Black Lillies & special guests, presented by Oxfam)
Carolina Chocolate Drops (Performance & Interview)
Discussion with Appalachian Citizens' Law Center
Mawre (African Drum/Dance)
Sonic Stage:
High and Mighty Brass Band
Jennifer Sullivan
Ásgeir
Sam Hunt
The Black Cadillacs
Royal Canoe
Syd Arthur
Snake & Jake's Christmas Club Barn:
Classic Hip Hop Party (Full Service Party)
Full Service Party

References

External links
Official website

Bonnaroo Music Festival by year
Bonnaroo
Bonnaroo
2014 music festivals
Bonnaroo